Leytonstone is an area in East London, England, within the London Borough of Waltham Forest.

Historically, it was part of the ancient parish of Leyton in the Becontree hundred of the ancient county of Essex. The first documented evidence of settlement is from the 14th century, describing a hamlet at ‘Leyton-atte-stone’; a reference to the Roman milestone located within the area, that formed a northern boundary of the parish. It remained largely rural until the 19th century, becoming part of the London postal district in 1856, the same year its railway station was opened (now on the Central line). When Greater London was created in 1965, the Municipal Borough of Leyton merged with Chingford and Walthamstow to form the London Borough of Waltham Forest.

At the northern end of Leytonstone High Road is The Green Man; a public house and road junction, under which the A12 runs. Leytonstone is noted for being the birthplace of Alfred Hitchcock, with a number of references to the filmmaker around the area, including painted murals, mosaics, a pub and a hotel.

History

Origins and Roman milestone
The main thoroughfare, Leytonstone High Road, is part of an ancient highway from Epping to London, on the borders of Epping Forest. A small hamlet at Leytonstone had existed since the early 14th century, when it formed part of the parish of Leyton St Mary. The name Leytonstone, originally "Leyton-atte-Stone", comes from nearby Leyton ("settlement (tun) on the River Lea") and the Roman milestone called the High Stone. 

The milestone still stands at the junction of Hollybush Hill (the A1199 road with Woodford) and New Wanstead (the A113 road with Woodford Bridge), near the eastern bounds of the parish. It is a restored 18th-century obelisk set up on an earlier stump, traditionally described as a Roman milestone, possibly marking an extension of the Roman road from Dunmow to Chigwell into London. Two of the obelisk inscriptions are still just legible, others not:
"To Epping XI Miles through Woodford, Loughton"
"To Ongar XV Miles through Woodford Bridge, Chigwell, Abridge"

Other Roman archaeological features have been found in nearby Leyton, including "a Roman cemetery south of Blind Lane, and massive foundations of some Roman building, with quantities of Roman brick... discovered in the grounds of Leyton Grange."

18th and 19th century
In 1722, author Daniel Defoe travelled through "Layton-stone, a place by some known, now as much, by the sign of the Green-Man". Leytonstone, along with Stratford, Leyton and Woodford, was one of the villages Defoe called desirable country retreats for wealthy merchants and financiers within an easy ride of the City.

Leytonstone remained largely rural until the opening of the railway at Leytonstone station in 1856, which gave quick and easy access to Stratford and central London. This, with increased availability of office and industrial work, had transformed the area into a suburban dormitory town by the end of the 19th century.
However, the forest land in the north and east of Leytonstone escaped development following a prolonged public campaign, when the Epping Forest Act 1878 preserved more than 200 acres (80 hectares) of open space for public use.

In 1898 the department store Bearmans, opened by Frank Bearman to sell furniture and clothing, was the first store outside central London with an escalator.

20th century
In the mid-1990s, the M11 link road (A12) was built through the area, despite a long-running protest by locals and road protestors. This and other protests led to the policy, Roads for Prosperity, being abandoned.  From 2001 to 2013, artists ran the 491 Gallery, a squatted social space in a building next the A12, that hosted events from exhibitions to gigs.

Areas of Leytonstone

Bushwood and Ferndale
Browning Road Conservation Area
Cann Hall
Cathall
Grove Green
Harrow Green
Upper Leytonstone
Wanstead Flats
Whipps Cross and Hollow Pond

Historic Areas
Holloway Down

Notable events

M11 Link Road Protest between 1993 and 1995.
The annual Leytonstone Festival was first held in 1995.  
Mosaics of Hitchcock Movies unveiled at Leytonstone tube station in May 2001.
Leytonstone Arts Trail is an annual arts festival which started in 2008, where locals and artists display art in their windows and local venues.
Leytonstone tube station attack in December 2015.
The annual Leytonstone Loves Film with The Barbican was first held in 2019.

Notable buildings and landmarks

The Green Man roundabout and public house at the north edge of Leytonstone, with associated statue and mosaic; it remains a signposting-point on the A12.
 
Leytonstone is the birth place of Sir Alfred Hitchcock. The entrance to Leytonstone tube station has mosaics of scenes from his films. Next to his birth site at 517 Leytonstone High Road, the building has been painted with a mural of birds, repeated in the pavement outside. A pub at 692 Leytonstone High Road was renamed The Birds, in reference to his film The Birds.
Leytonstone tube station, a post-war modernist building from 1947; designed by Thomas Bilbow, an architect for London Transport, as part of the Central line extension.
 Independent Buildings on Church Lane, an art deco building  and clock constructed by a local newspaper in 1934, replacing the Gaiety Cinema.  The adjoining Seascape House is of matching architectural style. 
St John the Baptist's Church, Leytonstone is Grade II listed. Built in 1832 and consecrated in 1833, it is a landmark church at the junction of High Road Leytonstone and Church Lane. The churchyard is host to a vintage market and occasional screenings of Alfred Hitchcock films, as part of the annual Leytonstone Festival.
St Andrew's Church, Leytonstone, Grade II listed, was built in 1886–1893 as a memorial to the local philanthropist William Cotton and designed by Sir Arthur Blomfield. 
Leytonstone and Wanstead Synagogue, a post-war building in the art deco style on the corner of Fillebrook Road and Drayton Road; built in 1954 by the local Jewish community.
Leytonstone Mosque, a 1970s adaptation of an 1880s church hall that was originally part of St John's, provides worship for up to 1000 male Sunni Muslims and a range of religious education for young boys. 

Leytonstone House, built 1800 and Grade II-listed, was the home of Sir Edward Buxton, MP and conservationist, who with his brother played a big part in preserving Epping, Hainault and Hatfield forests. It housed Bethnal Green School for the juvenile poor from 1868 to 1936.
Leytonstone Library – a Grade II* listed art deco building built in 1934 to the design of James Ambrose Dartnall – underwent s £1.5 million refurbishment completed in 2015.

Harrow Green Library, an art deco building opened in 1939 and closed in 2011 due to funding cuts; now run as a volunteer library in the same building, renamed The Junction.
Leytonstone War Memorial and Gardens revealed in 1925 in remembrance of people of Leyton and Leytonstone who fought in The Great War and World War II; sited in the middle of Harrow Green, which is also the site of the modernist-style Wesleyan Christian Centre, built in 1959.
The Red Lion, which has had a public house on the site since 1670.  The current building is from 1891, having been restored as craft beer pub, ballroom and hotel; currently owned by the pub group Antic London.
Whipps Cross University Hospital is set for redevelopment to include a brand-new hospital, along with new homes and other communal facilities. It was selected as one of six UK hospitals to receive a share of £2.7 billion of initial government funding in 2019.
Whipps Cross Lido was a swimming pool dug in 1905, updated to a chlorinated facility in 1937 and closed in 1982. Some remains of the building and access road can be found near Hollow Pond on Leyton Flats. 
Leytonstone Fire Station, in Leytonstone High Road, was a Victorian building that was replaced in February 2016 by the current building.
Pastures and Good Shepherd Building in Davies Lane is the location of a 17th-century house and later Children's Home; now a Youth Centre and Sports Hall that was threatened with redevelopment but saved by community protest in April 2021. 
West Ham Union Workhouse, whose buildings still remain in south Leytonstone, was originally part of the village of Holloway Down, located between Harrow Green and the Thatched House junction.
Epping Forest reaches Leytonstone in heath areas called Hollow Pond and Leyton Flats, and Wanstead Flats.

Governance
Leytonstone belonged originally to the ancient parish of Leyton in the Becontree Hundred of Essex. It became a separate ecclesiastical parish in 1845. The parish of Leyton formed part of the West Ham Poor law union. In 1894 it became part of Leyton Urban District, which was incorporated in 1926 as the Municipal Borough of Leyton.

Leytonstone became part of the London Borough of Waltham Forest in 1965 when Greater London was created. Within the borough, it divides into four council wards, each with three councillors: Forest ward (Whipps Cross area, parts of Upper Leytonstone as far as Grove Green), Leytonstone ward (the rest of Upper Leytonstone, the town centre, Bushwood and Ferndale areas), Cathall ward and Cann Hall ward (South Leytonstone areas).

The area forms part of the Leyton and Wanstead parliamentary constituency. , John Cryer has held the seat for the Labour Party. For elections to the London Assembly it is part of the North East constituency and the AM is Sem Moema of the Labour Party, who succeeded Jenette Arnold in 2021 .

Transport
Leytonstone tube station is in Travelcard Zones 3 and 4 on the Central line of the London Underground, and serves as the last stop before the line splits into the Fairlop Loop and the branch to Epping (Zone 6). Since 2016, night tube trains run on Friday and Saturdays on the Central line every 10 minutes between White City and Loughton (in Essex) or Hainault via Leytonstone. A series of tiled mosaics commemorating the local film director Alfred Hitchcock line the entrance passages to the station.

Leytonstone Bus Station stands either side of exits for Leytonstone tube station; key routes include the 257 to Stratford, the W15 to Hackney, and the night bus N8 to Tottenham Court Road.

Leytonstone High Road railway station is a London Overground railway station, located in the south of Leytonstone, serving the Gospel Oak to Barking line. In 2018, the line was electrified to allow for longer trains, with an additional capacity; after engineering and supply delays, these were introduced in June 2019.

Close to the southern end of Leytonstone ( south of the Cann Hall Road boundary) is Maryland railway station in Stratford; which is on the Elizabeth line.

From 25 October 2021, Leytonstone will be in London's Ultra Low Emission Zone (ULEZ); which is to be expanding from central London up to the North Circular and South Circular roads.

Education
Leytonstone schools include:

Buxton School, an all-through school for ages 3–16 and Specialist Science College
Connaught School for Girls, a specialist language school
Davies Lane Primary School, first opened in 1901 as a board school. In 1948 it became a junior and infants school, merging into a single primary in 2004.
George Tomlinson Primary School
Gwyn Jones Primary School
Leytonstone School, a specialist business and enterprise school
Mayville Nursery and Primary School, from 2-10yo
Norlington School, a boys' school and mixed sixth form

Sports and fitness
Leytonstone Leisure Centre on Cathall Road provides a gym and 25-metre main pool, sports hall, fitness studios, and a children's soft-play area.

Wanstead Flats has 60 football pitches, including eight full size pitches. This facility is overseen by City of London Corporation and amateur football teams play every Sunday. and 5K Parkruns take place in Wanstead Flats every week.

The North Star on Browning Road is home to the North Star Velo cycling club.

Leytonstone was home to the former association football team Leytonstone F.C. before it merged with Redbridge Forest F.C. and then Dagenham & Redbridge football club.

In drama, film and television
In The Bed-Sitting Room (1969), Spike Milligan created the (fictional) closest heir to the British throne after the outbreak of nuclear war as "Mrs. Ethel Shroake" of 393A High Street, Leytonstone. She appears in the final scene of the play.
Deep End, a 1970 British-German drama starring Jane Asher with a soundtrack by Can, was partly shot on Cann Hall Road and Cathall Road Baths (built 1906, rebuilt later in 1977).
Small Potatoes was a 1999 TV sitcom made by Hat Trick Productions for Channel 4, about the young manager of a video shop in Leytonstone.
I Proud to Be an Indian was a 2004 Bollywood film, about an Indian family in late 1970s Leytonstone terrorised by skinheads.
In EastEnders, the fictional character Kim Fox is from Leytonstone.

Notable people

Damon Albarn (born 1968), singer-songwriter born in Fillebrook Road, lead singer of Blur.
Eric Ashby, Baron Ashby (1904–1992), botanist, was born in Leytonstone.
Roger Ashton-Griffiths (born 1957), actor
David Bailey (born 1939), CBE, photographer, was born in Leytonstone.
Reginald Poynton Baker (1896–1985), movie producer, father of the Conservative MP Peter Baker
Ashley Banjo (born 1988), dancer and choreographer, was born in Leytonstone.
David Beckham OBE (born 1975), footballer (England, Manchester United, Real Madrid, LA Galaxy, AC Milan, Paris Saint-Germain), was born in Leytonstone and grew up in Chingford.
James Bevan (1858-1938), captain of the Welsh rugby union team in its first international match, died in Leytonstone
Reginald Horace Blyth (1898–1964), author and orientalist
Alan Booth (1946–1993), travel writer
Patrick Brill OBE RA (born 1963) artist, writer and musician; known by the pseudonym Bob and Roberta Smith
Edward North Buxton (1840–1924), conservationist and liberal politician
Cornelius Cardew (1936–1981), composer
Carly Cole (born 1984), model, fitness trainer and wife of footballer Joe Cole
Fanny Cradock (1909–1994), TV chef and cookery writer born in Fairlop Road, Leytonstone
Curtis Davies (born 1985), footballer
Cartrain (born 1991), artist
Harris Dickinson (born 1996), actor
Frank Dobson (1886–1963), sculptor, lived in Cobden Road as a teenager in 1901
John Drinkwater (1882–1937), poet and dramatist, born in Leytonstone in 1882
Charles Eade (1903–1964), journalist, born in Leytonstone
Eamon Everall (born 1948), artist and educator
Ken Farnes (1911–1941), cricketer
Henry Charles Fehr (1867–1940), sculptor, lived and worked in Leytonstone in 1886–1891.
Joanne Fenn (born 1974), Olympic runner
Stuart Freeborn (1914–2013), Star Wars make-up artist who was most famous as the designer of Yoda; born in Grove Green Road, had a Blue Heritage Plaque placed on his former home in December 2015.
Graham Gooch (born 1953), OBE, cricketer, former captain of the England cricket team
Jimmy Hallybone (born 1962), former professional footballer
Steve Harris (born 1956), founder and bassist of the band Iron Maiden
Sir Alfred Hitchcock (1899–1980), film director born and raised in the area. 
Tom Hood (1835–1874), humorist and playwright
Sydney Horler (1888–1964), novelist
Gavin Hoyte (born 1990), footballer
Justin Hoyte (born 1984), footballer
Derek Jacobi (born 1938) CBE, actor
Jammer (born 1982), record producer
Colin Kazim-Richards (born 1986), footballer
Lucy Kirkwood (born 1983), playwright and screenwriter
Don Law (1902–1982), record producer
Natasha Little (born 1969), actor
Seán Mac Stíofáin (1928–2001), chief-of-staff of the Provisional IRA
Morell Mackenzie (1837–1892), research physician
Colin Matthews (born 1946), composer
Dominic McVey (born 1985), Britain's youngest self-made millionaire
Jozef Piłsudski (1867–1935), Polish statesman, stayed with the Wasilewski family while on the run from Russia in the 1900s
Jamie Porter (born 1993), cricketer
Redzz (born 1987), rapper, actor, songwriter and musician
Sir Tony Robinson (born 1946), comedian and broadcaster
Jonathan Ross (born 1960), broadcaster and comedian. Went to Davies Lane primary school.
Paul Ross (born 1956), broadcaster
June Sarpong (born 1977) MBE, television presenter
Rita Simons (born 1977), actress, singer and model
Talvin Singh (born 1970), composer and musician
Adam Smith (born 1991), footballer

Harold Spurr (1889–1962), English cricketer
Andros Townsend (born 1991), footballer
Halszka Wasilewska (1899–1961), soldier, daughter of Leon Wasilewski, spent her infancy here before becoming a decorated major in the Polish Armed Forces
Leon Wasilewski (1870–1936), Polish political activist and editor lived in Leytonstone in 1898–1903
Douglas Webb (1922–1996), dam buster and photographer

References

External links

The Leytonstoner – a community news magazine and review website
Archives relating to Leytonstone at The National Archives (United Kingdom)

 
Areas of London
Districts of the London Borough of Waltham Forest
Business improvement districts in London
District centres of London